The KAI T-50 Golden Eagle (골든이글) is a family of South Korean supersonic advanced jet trainers and light combat aircraft, developed by Korea Aerospace Industries (KAI) with Lockheed Martin. The T-50 is South Korea's first indigenous supersonic aircraft and one of the world's few supersonic trainers. Development began in the late 1990s, and its maiden flight occurred in 2002. The aircraft entered active service with the Republic of Korea Air Force (ROKAF) in 2005.

The T-50 has been further developed into aerobatic and combat variants, namely T-50B, TA-50, and FA-50. A F-50 single-seat multirole fighter variant was considered before being cancelled. The T-50B serves with the South Korean air force's aerobatics team.

The T-50 has been ordered by a number of countries and entered into service in some of them. Iraq ordered 24 planes in a T-50IQ variant in 2013, and received them in 2016. The TA-50 light attack variant have also been ordered by Indonesia in 2011, with 16 planes entering Indonesian service by 2014; an additional 6 were ordered in 2021. The Philippines ordered 12 units of the FA-50 light fighter variant in 2014, delivered over the next few years, and the country is considering ordering another batch of 12 planes. Thailand ordered 12 units of the T-50 advanced trainer variant (T-50TH) starting in 2015. In 2022, Poland ordered 48 FA-50s.

Development

Origins
The T-50 program was originally intended to develop an indigenous trainer aircraft capable of supersonic flight, to train and prepare pilots for the KF-16 and F-15K, replacing trainers such as T-38 and A-37 that were then in service with the ROKAF. Prior South Korean aircraft programs include the turboprop KT-1 basic trainer produced by Daewoo Aerospace (now part of KAI), and license-manufactured KF-16. In general, the T-50 series of aircraft closely resembles the KF-16 in configuration.

The mother program, code-named KTX-2, began in 1992, but the Ministry of Finance and Economy suspended KTX-2 in 1995 due to financial constraints. The basic design of the aircraft was set by 1999. The development of the aircraft was funded 70% by the South Korean government, 17% by KAI, and 13% by Lockheed Martin.

The aircraft was formally designated as the T-50 Golden Eagle in February 2000. The T-50A designation was reserved by the U.S. military to prevent it from being inadvertently assigned to another aircraft model. Final assembly of the first T-50 took place between 15 January and 14 September 2001. The first flight of the T-50 took place in August 2002, with initial operational assessment from 28 July to 14 August 2003.

KAI and Lockheed Martin were pursuing a joint marketing program for the T-50 internationally. The ROKAF placed a production contract for 25 T-50s in December 2003, with aircraft scheduled to be delivered between 2005 and 2009. Original T-50 aircraft are equipped with the AN/APG-67(v)4 radar from Lockheed Martin. The T-50 is equipped with a GE F404 engine with Full Authority Digital Engine Control (FADEC) built under license by Samsung Techwin. Under the terms of the T-50/F404-102 co-production agreement, GE provides engine kits directly to Samsung Techwin, which produces designated parts and performs final engine assembly and testing.

Improved variants
The program has expanded beyond a trainer concept to include the TA-50 light attack aircraft and the FA-50 light combat aircraft. The TA-50 variant is a more heavily armed version of the T-50 trainer, intended for lead-in fighter training and light attack roles. It is equipped with the Elta EL/M-2032 fire control radar. The TA-50 is designed to operate as a full-fledged combat platform for precision-guided weapons, air-to-air missiles, and air-to-ground missiles. The TA-50 can mount additional utility pods for reconnaissance, targeting assistance, and electronic warfare.  Reconnaissance and electronic warfare variants are also being developed, designated RA-50 and EA-50, respectively.

The FA-50 is the most advanced version of the T-50, possessing more internal fuel capacity, enhanced avionics, a longer radome, and a tactical datalink. It is equipped with a modified Israeli EL/M-2032 pulse-Doppler radar with Korean-specific modifications by LIG Nex1. The radar of the FA-50 has a range two-thirds greater than the TA-50's radar. The EL/M-2032 was initially chosen over Lockheed Martin's preferred AN/APG-67(V)4 and SELEX Vixen 500E active electronically scanned array (AESA) radars. Other AESA radars such as Raytheon's AN/APG-79 and Northrop Grumman's AN/APG-83 are options for future production, and may be shared with the radar chosen for USAF and ROKAF F-16 fighters. Samsung Thales is also independently developing a domestic multi-mode AESA radar for the FA-50.

In December 2008, South Korea awarded a contract to KAI to convert four T-50s to FA-50 standard by 2012. In 2012, the ROKAF ordered 20 FA-50 fighters to be delivered by the end of 2014. The maiden flight of the FA-50 took place in 2011. 60 FA-50 aircraft are to be produced for the ROKAF from 2013 to 2016. KAI received a  order for FA-50 fighter aircraft in May 2013.

In December 2015, KAI announced and revealed the new KAI-LM T-50 T-X upgrade intended to compete in the U.S. T-X program that will start testing in 2016. This variant features a dorsal hump for extra internal fuel and an aerial refuelling receptacle, large area display (LAD), and embedded ground training systems.

In October ADEX 2017, KAI unveiled the T-50A as a new variant based on the FA-50 multirole combat aircraft, including fifth generation cockpit, an aerial refuelling receptacle, cockpit multifunction display, dorsal hump for extra internal fuel, and an embedded training suite.

In January 2019, KAI has begun development on an improved FA-50 known as block 10 and block 20 upgrades. Block 10 is a software upgrade so it can use the Lockheed Martin AN/AAQ-33 sniper targeting pod, while the block 20 is improvement capability to conduct beyond-visual-range air-to-air missions, carrying munitions such as the AIM-120 AMRAAM.

Design

Overview
The T-50 Golden Eagle resembles the F-16 Fighting Falcon, though it is only 80% of the size. The aerospace engineering units of Samsung, Hyundai, and Daewoo were merged to form KAI, and Lockheed Martin designed the avionics including providing the fly-by-wire system.

The trainer has seating for two pilots in a tandem arrangement. The high-mounted canopy developed by Hankuk Fiber is applied with stretched acrylic, providing the pilots good visibility. The trainer has been tested to offer the canopy with ballistic protection against 4 lb objects impacting at 400 knots. The altitude limit is 14,600 m (48,000 ft), and airframe is designed to last 8,000 hours of service. The seven internal fuel tanks have a capacity of 2,655 L (701 US gal), five in the fuselage and two in the wings.  An additional 1,710 L (452 US gal) of fuel can be carried in the three external fuel tanks. T-50 trainer variants have a paint scheme of white and red, and aerobatic variants white, black, and yellow.

The T-50 uses a single General Electric F404-102 turbofan engine license-produced by Samsung Techwin, upgraded with a FADEC system jointly developed by General Electric and KAI. The engine consists of three-staged fans, a seven-axial-stage arrangement, and an afterburner. The aircraft has a maximum speed of Mach 1.5. Its engine produces a maximum of 78.7 kN (17,700 lbf) of thrust with afterburner. The more powerful GE F414 and Eurojet EJ200 engines have been suggested as the new engine for the T-50 family.

Avionics

The T-50's central processing unit and its operating system are developed by MDS Technology. The T-50's NEOS avionics operating system is the first and only real-time operating system to be developed by an Asian company, and holds both DO-178B and IEEE POSIX certification. Samsung Thales and LIG Nex1 are the main avionics and Electronic warfare equipment developers for T-50 and its variants. Other South Korean companies and defense institutes such as DoDAAM Systems, Aeromaster, Intellics, and Korea Institute of Defense Analysis are responsible for the aircraft's secondary avionics and embedded systems, including store management computers, avionics testing equipment, flight data recorders, portable maintenance aids, data analysis software, post-flight data processing system, aircraft structure and engine management software, and mission planning and support systems. The TA-50 version is equipped with an Elta EL/M-2032 fire control radar.

The T-50 is equipped with a Honeywell H-764G embedded global positioning/inertial navigation system and HG9550 radar altimeter. The aircraft is the first trainer to feature triple-redundant digital fly-by-wire controls. The cockpit panels, switches, and joysticks are produced by South Korea's FirsTec and Sungjin Techwin, head-up display by DoDaaM Systems, and multi-function display by Samsung Thales. Other South Korean subcontractors such as Elemech, Dawin Friction, and Withus cooperate in T-50 components production. Hanwha supplies the mechanical parts for the flight control system, and WIA supplies the undercarriage.

Armament and equipment
The TA-50 version has a three-barrel cannon version of the M61 Vulcan mounted internally behind the cockpit, which fires linkless 20 mm ammunition. Wingtip rails can accommodate the AIM-9 Sidewinder missile, and a variety of additional weapons can be mounted on underwing hardpoints. Compatible air-to-surface weapons include the AGM-65 Maverick missile, Hydra 70 and LOGIR rocket launchers, CBU-58 and Mk-20 cluster bombs, and Mk-82, −83, and −84 general-purpose bombs.

The FA-50 can be externally fitted with Rafael's Sky Shield or LIG Nex1's ALQ-200K ECM pods, Sniper or LITENING targeting pods, and Condor 2 reconnaissance pods to further improve the fighter's electronic warfare, reconnaissance, and targeting capabilities. Other improved weapon systems include SPICE multifunctional guidance kits, Textron CBU-97/105 Sensor Fuzed Weapon with WCMD tail kits, JDAM, JDAM-ER for more comprehensive air-to-ground operations, and AIM-120 missiles for BVR air-to-air operations. FA-50 has provisions for, but does not yet integrate, Python and Derby missiles, also produced by Rafael, and other anti-ship missiles, stand-off weapons, and sensors to be domestically developed by Korea.

In February 2018, European maker MBDA, in Singapore air show showcased an offer of its Meteor and ASRAAM medium and short-range air-to-air missiles available for integration for the KAI platforms FA-50 and future KF-X fighter jets.

Operational history

Republic of Korea

In 2011, the first squadron with the TA-50, the T-50's light attack variant, became operational with the ROKAF. The ROKAF's Black Eagles aerobatic team operates the T-50B version. In 2014, the FA-50 was officially deployed by the ROKAF with President Park Geun-hye officially leading a ceremony during which a flight demonstration was held showing its capabilities. 20 FA-50s was assigned its own Air Force wing. 60 FA-50s were ordered by ROKAF. On 9 October 2014, an FA-50 successfully test fired an AGM-65 Maverick at a stationary target, a retired ship.

Indonesia

Indonesia had been considering the T-50, along with four other aircraft to replace its BAE Systems Hawk Mk 53 trainer and OV-10 Bronco attack aircraft. In August 2010, Indonesia announced that T-50, Yak-130 and L-159 were the remaining candidates for its requirement for 16 advanced jet trainers.

In May 2011, Indonesia signed a contract to order 16 T-50 trainer aircraft for US$400 million. The aircraft is to feature weapons pylons and gun modules, enabling light attack capabilities. The Golden Eagles are to replace the Hawk Mk 53 in Indonesian Air Force service. Indonesia's version has been designated T-50i.  Deliveries began in September 2013. The last pair of T-50i aircraft were delivered in January 2014.

In July 2021, KAI has confirmed that it has been awarded a contract to supply another batch of T-50s to the Indonesia. The contract is said to be worth US$240 million and includes 6 T-50s along with support and logistics package for aircraft operations.

Iraq
Iraq was negotiating the acquisition of T-50 trainer jets, having first publicly expressed official interest during the Korea–Iraq summit in Seoul on 24 February 2009. In April 2010, Iraq reopened the jet lead-in fighter-trainer competition for 24 aircraft, in which TA-50 competed. In December 2013, it was announced that Iraq signed a contract for 24 aircraft of the FA-50 variant designated T-50IQ, plus additional equipment and pilot training over the next 20 years. Deliveries were to begin in April 2016, with all aircraft to be delivered over the next 12 months. The first batch of aircraft was delivered in March 2017 with the second batch arriving in May 2018.  However, the aircraft were not flown until June 2022, following the negotiation of a maintenance, logistics and training contract with KAI in November 2021.

Philippines

The Philippine Air Force (PAF) chose 12 KAI TA-50 aircraft to fulfill its requirement for a light attack and lead-in fighter trainer aircraft. The Department of National Defense (DND) announced the selection of the type in August 2012. Funding for 12 aircraft was approved by Congress in September 2012.

In late January 2013, state media reported that the FA-50 variant, not the TA-50 variant as previously reported, was selected for the procurement. In October 2013, President Benigno Aquino III said that the DND was close to finalizing the FA-50 deal. On 19 October 2013, President Aquino and President Park Geun-hye of South Korea signed a memorandum of understanding (MoU) with provisions for acquisitions.

On 13 February 2014, President Aquino approved the payment scheme for purchasing 12 lead-in fighter trainers with P18.9 billion ($415.7 million) budgeted. On 28 March 2014, the DND signed a contract for 12 FA-50 fighter aircraft worth P18.9 billion (US$421.12 million).

Deliveries began in November 2015 and all 12 aircraft were delivered by 31 May 2017. Plans were laid for 3 or 4 FA-50s to be fitted with capability for beyond visual range (BVR) intercept. In March 2015, Stockholm International Peace Research Institute (SIPRI) reported that the Philippines plans to order additional FA-50s, which is supported by the PAF Flight Plan 2028 that lists another 12 FA-50s planned for the future.

On 26 January 2017, two PAF FA-50PHs conducted a nighttime attack on terrorist hideouts in Butig, Lanao del Sur in Mindanao, the first combat sorties flown by these aircraft. In June 2017, FA-50s were deployed to conduct airstrikes against Maute terrorists entrenched in the city of Marawi starting in May 2017. On 12 July 2017, an FA-50 was involved in a friendly fire incident during the battle of Marawi, when a bomb landed approximately 250 meters off target, killing two Philippine soldiers and injuring 11 more. Investigation resulted in clearing the aircrew and aircraft of fault and the type was allowed to return to active service in August.

In June 2018, it was discussed that the PAF is reviewing the possibility of acquiring 12 more aircraft.

On 2 February 2019, two PAF FA-50s dropped eight 250-pound bombs on a base of the ISIS-linked Bangsamoro Islamic Freedom Fighters (BIFF) in response to a bomb attack on the Our Lady of Mount Carmel Cathedral in Barangay Walled City, Jolo, Sulu.

On 25 June 2020, in relation to its 73rd founding anniversary, the PAF conducted a live fire exercise off the coast of Palawan. The exercise was the first live-firing of an AGM-65G2 Maverick air-to-ground missile fired from a PAF FA-50PH aircraft against a floating target, to demonstrate its anti-ship capabilities.

On 25 December 2020 one day before the 52nd anniversary of the Communist Party of the Philippines, a PAF FA-50 dropped six bombs, including a GPS-guided bomb, that resulted in the deaths of three New People's Army rebels at their base camp in Daguma Mountain Range in Sultan Kudarat province.

Thailand
In September 2015, the Thai government chose a KAI T-50 variant, called the T-50TH, for its air force over the Chinese Hongdu L-15 to replace its aging L-39 Albatros trainers. The 4 T-50TH aircraft were scheduled to be delivered by March 2018. In July 2017, Thailand's government approved the procurement of 8 more aircraft with a contract signing expected later in the month. Deliveries began in January 2018.

Poland
On 22 July 2022, Poland's Defense Minister Mariusz Blaszczak said in a media interview that the country is buying 48 FA-50 fighters. On 28 July, KAI officially signed the deal for 12 FA-50 Block 10 and 36 FA-50PL Block 20 with the Polish government. FA-50 deliveries are to start in 2023. Blaszczak said KAI's ability to deliver the aircraft quickly was the decisive factor in it being chosen. As a result of the 2022 Russian invasion of Ukraine, the Polish Air Force desired urgently to replace their remaining MiG-29 fighter and Su-22 attack aircraft and the U.S. was unable to supply additional F-16s in such a short timeframe. Along with the fighter deal, KAI is expected to help establish a servicing center for them in Poland in cooperation with Polish defense industries by 2026.

Malaysia
On 24 February 2023, KAI announced the signing of a $920 million deal with the Malaysian Ministry of Defence for the purchase of 18 FA-50 Block 20 for the Royal Malaysian Air Force's light combat aircraft (LCA) and fighter in-lead trainer (FLIT) tender, which is intended to replace the Aermacchi MB-339 and Hawk Mk 108/208 currently in service. The FA-50 was in competition with the Indian HAL Tejas, Italian Alenia Aermacchi M-346 Master, Turkish TAI Hürjet, Chinese Hongdu L-15, Russian Mikoyan MiG-35, and Sino-Pakistani JF-17 Thunder.

Possible sales
 Azerbaijan: Azerbaijani Air Forces has expressed interest in purchasing T-50 trainers.
 Bolivia: the T-50 has been offered to the Bolivian Air Force as their new light jet fighter.
 Brunei: Royal Brunei Air Force has expressed interest in the FA-50.
 Colombia: On 29 April 2022 it was rumored that the Colombian Air Force had chosen 20 TA-50 and FA-50 Golden Eagles as its next jet trainer and fighter. but it was later denied by the Colombian Air Force
 Croatia: The FA-50 is also being offered to Croatia, which is deciding on a replacement for its aging fleet of MiG-21BIS aircraft. However, in October 2017, KAI did not bid as the FA-50 could not satisfy the Croatian fighter requirements.  The Croatian Air Force then selected the French Rafale.  Croatia needs to purchase lead in-trainer aircraft that KAI could bid on. Program is yet to be announced by Croatian Government.
 Pakistan: Pakistan Air Force is considering purchase of the South Korean KAI T-50 Lead in Fighter Trainer (LIFT) to revamp its air force training program.
 Spain: Spanish Air Force was interested in a cooperation agreement with South Korea for use of training aircraft, including the T-50. In November 2018, Spain was in talks with South Korea to swap 50 basic T-50 jet trainers for 4 to 5 Airbus A400M airlifters.
Slovakia: On October 3, 2021 Yonhap News Agency reported that Korea Aerospace Industries (KAI) was seeking to export the FA-50 to the Slovak Air Force. A Memorandum of understanding (MOU) was reportedly signed between KAI and LOTN, a Slovakian State-owned enterprise to facilitate industrial offset negotiations.
 United Arab Emirates: United Arab Emirates Air Force is seeking 35–40 fighter-trainers. In February 2009, the UAE selected the M-346 over the T-50. In January 2010, the UAE reopened the trainer contest. In 2011, it was confirmed that the T-50 was still competing for the UAE purchase.
 United States: The TF-50A a variant FA-50 is one of the contenders for the U.S. Air Force's Advanced Tactical Trainer program, with an opportunity to export 100 to 400 aircraft. The TF-50B a variant FA-50 is one of the contenders for the U.S. Navy's Tactical Surrogate Aircraft program, with an opportunity to export 64 aircraft.
 Vietnam: Government of Vietnam looks to purchase FA-50 light fighters from U.S. and South Korea.

South Korea also plans to offer the FA-50 to Colombia and Peru. Local media reported that the FA-50 could be a more affordable option than the Saab Gripen for the Botswana Defence Force Air Wing, citing Korean Aerospace Industries, signaling potential interest by the country.

Failed bids
 Argentina: Argentine Air Force evaluated the FA-50 as a potential new platform in 2016. The Argentine government is seeking to buy the FA-50 through repatriation in Korea. MSN reported the Argentine defense minister said that when the financial aid is secured a contract for the FA-50 with KAI can be signed by December 2017. As of July 2019, the Argentine Air Force, is set to buy FA-50s as an interim replacement for the retired Mirage 3, 5, and Dagger force. It is also to help replace the retiring A-4AR Fightinghawk fleet, as those aircraft are aging and becoming difficult to repair and maintain. If the deal is approved it will be a first step in modernizing and revitalizing the country's fighter fleet. KAI later notified the Argentine government that a sale would not be possible due the UK blocking it on the grounds of an arms embargo — the aircraft features various British components, including Martin-Baker ejection seats.
 Israel: Israeli Air Force evaluated the T-50 as a possible replacement for its McDonnell Douglas A-4N Skyhawk II trainers since 2003. On 16 February 2012, Israel announced its decision to procure 30 M-346s instead.
 Singapore: Republic of Singapore Air Force evaluated the T-50 against the Italian Alenia Aermacchi M-346 and the BAE Systems Hawk for a $500 million trainer acquisition program contract for 12–16 aircraft. The Singapore Ministry of Defense eventually selected the M-346 aircraft ahead of T-50 and BAE Hawk in July 2010.
 Taiwan: Republic of China Air Force is looking to replace its current fleet of AT-3 jet trainers and F-5 LIFT planes with 66 advanced trainers, the ROC Air Force released a request for information (RFI) and two companies have responded including Lockheed Martin for the T-50 and Alenia Aermacchi's M-346 responded to the request. The planes are expected to be license produced in Taiwan with a local partner firm, and the overall estimated contract value is 69 billion New Taiwan dollars (US$2.2 billion). However, Taiwan decided to build 66 AIDC T-5 Brave Eagle supersonic trainers based on Taiwan's existing AIDC F-CK-1 Ching-kuo fighters for NT$68.6 billion instead of selecting the T-50 or M-346.
 United States: The T-50A was one of the contenders for the U.S. Air Force's T-X program, with an opportunity to export 300 to 1,000 aircraft. In September 2018 the U.S. Air Force selected Boeing's T-7 trainer. In January 2020, the U.S. Air Force posted a notice stating that it would lease four to eight T-50A trainers from Hillwood Aviation due to delays in manufacturing the T-7A. In August 2020 the acquisition was delayed due to the COVID-19 pandemic; in October it was announced that the plan had been further delayed .
 Uzbekistan: In October 2015, the U.S. refused to approve the sale of the KAI T-50 advance trainer to Uzbekistan. The T-50 uses a US-made engine, the F404, which requires a US export license to re-export to another country along the T-50.  However, due to political considerations related to Uzbekistan, the US refused to approve this.

Variants

 T-50: Advanced trainer version.
 T-50B: Aerobatic-specialized T-50 version. Currently used by ROKAF's aerobatic display team, the Black Eagles.
 TA-50: Lead-in fighter trainer and light attack version.
 FA-50: Light fighter/attack version, originally named A-50. A prototype from a converted T-50 first flew in 2011.
 Block 10: Software upgrades to enable integration of Lockheed Martin AN/AAQ-33 Sniper targeting pod 
 Block 20: Integration of telescopic probe solution from Cobham Mission Systems for inflight refueling capability, conformal 300 gallon fuel tank for better range, integration of mid-range air-to-surface missiles and beyond-visual-range air-to-air missiles (BVRAAMs), avionics upgrade and possible AESA radar
 F-50: A proposed single–seat multirole fighter variant that was cancelled in favor of the KAI KF-21.

Country-specific versions

T-50i: Version of the T-50 for Indonesian Air Force.

 T-50IQ: Version of the FA-50 for Iraqi Air Force.

 FA-50PH: Version of the FA-50 for the Philippine Air Force

 FA-50PL: Version of the FA-50 for the Polish Air Force.

 T-50TH: Version of the T-50 for Royal Thai Air Force. with some FA-50/TA-50 equipment and capability such as EL/M-2032 radar, MIL-STD-1760 interface, 20 mm gun, Radar warning receiver, Countermeasures Dispenser System. Compatible to Laser-guided bomb, AIM-9 Sidewinder and AGM-65 Maverick missile, integration for Beyond-visual-range missile

 T-50A: Failed candidate for the US Air Force T-X program, based on the FA-50.
 TF-50A: candidate for the US Air Force Advanced Tactical Trainer program, based on the FA-50
 TF-50B: candidate for the US Navy Tactical Surrogate Aircraft program, based on the FA-50

Operators

;
 Indonesian Air Force – 16 T-50i trainer aircraft were delivered by January 2014. These were fitted with radars and cannons in 2018. 14 aircraft are in service as of August 2020. In July 2021, Indonesia signed a contract for a further six planes at a cost of US$240 million with delivery by October 2024.

 Iraqi Air Force – 24 T-50IQ light fighters were delivered by November 2019.

 Royal Malaysian Air Force - 18 units of FA-50 Block 20 on order.

 Philippine Air Force – 12 FA-50PH light fighter aircraft were delivered by 31 May 2017.

Polish Air Force – 12 FA-50 Block 10 and 36 FA-50PL Block 20 on order.

 Republic of Korea Air Force – 50 T-50s, 10 T-50Bs, 22 TA-50s, and 60 FA-50s aircraft in service as of October 2016.

 Royal Thai Air Force – 12 T-50TH trainers ordered in total. The first four aircraft were delivered in April 2018.

Accidents and incidents
 On 15 November 2012, a South Korean air force pilot from the service's Black Eagles aerobatic display team was killed when his KAI T-50B trainer crashed in a mountainside in the area of Hoengsong, about 48 nm (90 km) east of Seoul, due to human error during a maintenance operation.
 On 20 December 2015, an Indonesian Air Force T-50i Golden Eagle crashed while performing a flight demonstration during an airshow at Adisutjipto Air base in Yogyakarta, killing its two pilots possibly caused by pilot error.
 On 6 February 2018, a South Korean aerobatic team's plane flipped over after the pilot did not align the nose wheel properly, and turned off NWS prematurely at Changi Airport. It was taking off in preparation for a display at the Singapore Airshow.
On August 10, 2020, a 38-year-old Indonesian Air Force T-50i pilot died from injuries sustained during a training accident at the Iswahyudi Air Force Base.
On July 19, 2022, an Indonesian Air Force T-50i crashed in Central Java during a nighttime training mission, killing its pilot.

Specifications

 LIG Nex1 (FA-50 Block 20)

See also

References

External links

 KAI T-50 page
 Lockheed Martin T-50 product page
 

T-50
2000s South Korean military trainer aircraft
Single-engined jet aircraft
General Dynamics F-16 Fighting Falcon
Mid-wing aircraft
Aircraft first flown in 2002
Fourth-generation jet fighter